Corbicula japonica is an edible species of brackishwater clam, a bivalve mollusk in the family Cyrenidae, the basket clams.

The common names of the species include Shijimi (after its Japanese name), Japanese basket clam, or Japanese blue clam.

Summary 
Japanese basket clams settle at the mouths of rivers in brackish water. During low tide, people are able to see them in tidal flats and collect them for food. Their shells are roughly 30-35mm and are reddish-brown while young, turning black as they mature. Their shells are glossy and have a tendency to grow concentric circles from their base, similar to Corbicula fluminea. The inside of their shells is purple when they are young and becomes white as they mature. Their reproduction is based on gonochorism.

As food 

Shijimi and Asari (Venerupis philippinarum) are the most popular types of clam used in miso soup and Tsukudani in Japan.

See also
 Ornithine

References 

Cyrenidae
Bivalves described in 1846